Abzakovo (Abźaq) is a rural locality (a village) in Mansurovsky Selsoviet of Uchalinsky District, Bashkortostan, Russia. The population was 500 as of 2010. There are 12 streets.

Geography 
Abzakovo is located 38 km north of Uchaly (the district's administrative centre) by road. Absalyamovo is the nearest rural locality.

Ethnicity 
The village is inhabited by Bashkirs and others and others.

References 

Rural localities in Uchalinsky District